Phtheochroa simoniana is a species of moth of the family Tortricidae. It is found in Italy, Spain, Portugal and Morocco.

The wingspan is 16–18 mm. Adults have been recorded on wing from February to March.

References

Moths described in 1859
Phtheochroa